Sylvain Brault (born 1958) is a Canadian cinematographer from Quebec. He is most noted as a two-time Genie Award nominee for Best Cinematography, receiving nods at the 15th Genie Awards in 1994 for My Friend Max (Mon amie Max), and at the 17th Genie Awards in 1996 for Rowing Through.

He is the son of filmmaker and cinematographer Michel Brault, with whom he worked on several films early in his career; the short documentary film L'Emprise won awards at the Yorkton Film Festival in 1988 for both Michel as best director and Sylvain as best cinematographer. He directed and filmed music videos for Julie Masse and Joe Bocan in the late 1980s and early 1990s, and married Masse in 1993; Brault and Masse were divorced by 1995, when Masse remarried to Corey Hart.

Filmography
L'Emprise - 1988
The Paper Wedding (Les noces de papier) - 1989
My Friend Max (Mon amie Max) - 1994
Meurtre en musique - 1994
Circus Passion (Le Feu sacré) - 1994
Rowing Through - 1996
Coyote Run - 1996
Mistaken Identity (Erreur sur la personne) - 1996
Les Boys - 1997
The Long Winter (Quand je serai parti... vous vivrez encore) - 1999
2001: A Space Travesty - 2000
Hidden Agenda - 2001 
Jack Paradise: Montreal by Night (Jack Paradise : Les nuits de Montréal) - 2004

References

External links

1958 births
Living people
Canadian cinematographers
Canadian music video directors
French Quebecers
People from Beloeil, Quebec